Bishopdale may refer to:

 Bishopdale, North Yorkshire, England
 Bishopdale, Canterbury, a suburb of Christchurch, New Zealand
 Bishopdale, Nelson, a suburb of Nelson, New Zealand

See also 
 RFA Bishopdale